The C. J. Ostl Site is an archaeological site in Ochopee, Florida. It is located off U.S. 41, near Fifty-Mile Bend. On December 15, 1978, it was added to the U.S. National Register of Historic Places.

References

External links
 Collier County listings at National Register of Historic Places
 Collier County listings at Florida's Office of Cultural and Historical Programs

National Register of Historic Places in Big Cypress National Preserve
Archaeological sites in Florida
National Register of Historic Places in Collier County, Florida